X File Explorer (Xfe) is a graphical file manager for the X Window System for Unix and Unix-like operating systems, written by Roland Baudin. Its stated goals are simplicity, lightness and ease of use. It is written in the programming language C++ using the FOX toolkit, and licensed under the terms of the GNU General Public License.

References

External links

 

Free file managers